Mikhail Ulyanov may refer to:
 Mikhail Alexandrovich Ulyanov, actor
 Mikhail Ivanovich Ulyanov, diplomat